The Deutscher Städtetag (Association of German Cities) is an organization that represents interests of cities in Germany. It began in 1905, dissolved in 1933, then re-formed in 1945. As of 2019 some 200 cities comprise its membership. The association's mission centers on sustaining the guarantee of local self-governance specified in the Grundgesetz für die Bundesrepublik Deutschland (German constitution), Article 28, paragraph 2.

Member cities

Listed below are the approximately 200 member cities and towns of the Deutsche Städtetag, also referred to as Direct members (Unmittelbare Mitglieder) by the organization. In addition there are approximately another 3,000 cities and towns that are indirect members (Mittelbare Mitglieder). This means that they are not members of the Deutsche Städtetag itself, but are members of at least one of its Member associations (Mitgliedsverbände), such as the Städtetag Nordrhein-Westfalen or the Städte- und Gemeindebund Sachsen-Anhalt, for instance.

Presidents
 1948–1949: Louise Schroeder
 1949–1953: Ernst Reuter
 1954–1955, 1957–1958: 
 1955–1957: Otto Suhr
 1958–1963: Willy Brandt
 1963–1965: Arnulf Klett
 1965–1967: Alfred Dregger
 1967–1970: Willi Brundert
 1970–1971: Hans-Jochen Vogel
 1971–1977: Hans Koschnick
 1977–1979, 1980, 1981-1983, 1989–1993: Manfred Rommel
 1979–1980: 
 1983–1985: 
 1985–1986: Walter Wallmann
 1986, 1987–1989: 
 1993–1995: 
 1995–1997: 
 1997–1999, 2002–2005, 2009–2011: Petra Roth
 1999–2002: 
 2005–2009, 2011–2013: Christian Ude
 2013–2015: Ulrich Maly
 2015–2017: Eva Lohse
 2018–present:

References

This article incorporates information from the German Wikipedia.

Further reading
issued by the association

External links
 Official site

Political organisations based in Germany
1905 establishments in Germany
Cities in Germany